The  was an infantry division of the Imperial Japanese Army. It was formed 10 July 1945 in Jiamusi as a triangular division. It was a part of the 8 simultaneously created divisions batch comprising 134th, 135th,  136th, 137th, 138th, 139th, 148th and 149th divisions. The nucleus for the formation were the 14th border guards group, Fujin garrison and 78th Independent Mixed Brigade.

Action
The division formation was complete 30 July 1945. 
Initially the 134th division was assigned to the 5th army, but was reassigned to 1st area army at the start of the Soviet invasion of Manchuria 9 August 1945. The division combat efficiency was estimated by Kwantung Army to be 15%.

As the positions at Songhua River were deemed untenable, the 134th division have started retreat to Fangzheng County after a few delaying skirmishes. Since the divisional radio equipment breakdown 11 August 1945, the 134th division situation is unknown, with no contemporary records covering period prior to surrender of Japan 15 August 1945.

The 134th division was disarmed 25 August 1945, after suffering 471 men killed in the short campaign. Despite light losses, the division was severely disorganized, losing one-third of combat efficiency during retreat.

The majority of men of 134th division were taken to Soviet Union labour camps near Khabarovsk 26 September 1945.

See also
 List of Japanese Infantry Divisions
 Independent Mixed Brigades (Imperial Japanese Army)

Notes and references
This article incorporates material from Japanese Wikipedia page 第134師団 (日本軍), accessed 7 July 2016
 Madej, W. Victor, Japanese Armed Forces Order of Battle, 1937–1945 [2 vols], Allentown, PA: 1981.

Japanese World War II divisions
Infantry divisions of Japan
Military units and formations established in 1945
Military units and formations disestablished in 1945
1945 establishments in Japan
1945 disestablishments in Japan